Vick is an unincorporated community in Avoyelles Parish, Louisiana, United States. Its ZIP code is 71331.

Notes

Unincorporated communities in Avoyelles Parish, Louisiana
Unincorporated communities in Louisiana